Carolina Moon may refer to:

"Carolina Moon" (song)
Carolina Moon (1940 film)
Carolina Moon (2007 film)
Carolina Moon (novel)